Jalan Sungai Ujong, Federal Route 241, is a major highway in Negeri Sembilan, Malaysia which connecting Seremban to Seremban 2. The stretch between Seremban and Jalan Labu junction used to be known as Negeri Sembilan State Route N38. It is a main route to the North–South Expressway Southern Route via Seremban Interchange. The kilometre zero of the Federal Route 241 is at Seremban.

At most sections, the Federal Route 241 was built under the JKR R5 road standard, allowing maximum speed limit of up to 90 km/h.

List of junctions

References

Highways in Malaysia
Malaysian Federal Roads